Christian amendment describes any of several attempts to amend a country's constitution in order to officially make it a Christian state.

In the United States, the most significant attempt to amend the United States Constitution by inserting explicitly Christian ideas and language began during the American Civil War and was spearheaded by the National Reform Association.

Samoa 
In June 2017, Samoa became a Christian state after Parliament passed a bill to amend its constitution; Article 1 of the Samoan Constitution states that "Samoa is a Christian nation founded on God the Father, the Son and the Holy Spirit".

United States

Initial proposals 
In February 1863, during the American Civil War, a coalition of eleven Protestant denominations from seven northern states gathered to discuss the state of the nation. Seeing the Civil War as God's punishment for the omission of God from the Constitution, they discussed a proposed amendment to alter the wording of the Preamble to acknowledge God. The idea that civil governments derive their legitimacy from God, and Jesus in particular, was alleged to be based on Biblical passages such as Psalm 2 and Romans 13. The original draft of the amendment, by Pennsylvania attorney John Alexander, read:

The Christian Amendment Movement was founded the next year and quickly renamed the "National Reform Association" with Alexander as its first president. They sent a memorial to Congress formally proposing the following amendment:

A delegation from the National Reform Association sought to meet with Abraham Lincoln on February 11, 1864, to solicit his endorsement of the amendment. Lincoln's pastor, Rev. Phineas Gurley, arranged for Lincoln to meet the delegation. After hearing their petition, Lincoln responded:

The proposal was supported by Senators Charles Sumner, B. Gratz Brown and John Sherman, but did not come to a vote in Congress. One member of the National Reform Association, James Pollock, played a role in getting the phrase "In God We Trust" on the two-cent coin in 1864.

Another version of the amendment read:

Similar proposals were considered by Congress in 1874, 1895, 1896, 1910, 1947, 1949, 1951, 1953, 1955, 1956, 1957, 1959, 1961, 1963, 1965, 1967, and 1969 but none passed.

Later attempts 
With the growing backlash in American society against communism in the 1940s and 1950s, new efforts were made to introduce Christianity into the Constitution, although these efforts were now in the form of standard constitutional amendments. In 1954 Vermont Senator Ralph Flanders proposed:
 Section 1: This nation devoutly recognizes the authority and law of Jesus Christ, Savior and Ruler of nations, through whom are bestowed the blessings of Almighty God.
 Section 2: This amendment shall not be interpreted so as to result in the establishment of any particular ecclesiastical organization, or in the abridgment of the rights of religious freedom, or freedom of speech and press, or of peaceful assemblage.
 Section 3: Congress shall have power, in such cases as it may deem proper, to provide a suitable oath or affirmation for citizens whose religious scruples prevent them from giving unqualified allegiance to the Constitution as herein amended.

None of the proposals came to a Congressional vote.

There were calls for similar amendments in the wake of the 1962 Supreme Court case Engel v. Vitale, which ruled school-sponsored and dictated prayer in schools unconstitutional. Over 200 similar amendment proposals were introduced to Congress between 1894 and 1984.

See also 
 Accommodationism
 Christian democracy
 Christian nationalism
 Christian right
 Christian state
 Church of the Holy Trinity v. United States
 Constitutional references to God
 Establishment Clause of the First Amendment

References

External links
 The NRA (National Reform Association) and the Christian Amendment, by Jim Allison, at the website "The Constitutional Principle: Separation of Church and State"
 A Letter to James Dobson, by William Gould, The Christian Statesman, September–October 1996
 The Roots of Our Problem, by Raymond Joseph, The Christian Statesman, January–February 1998
 God on Our Coins, a written statement of Jon G. Murray to the Congressional Subcommittee on Consumer Affairs and Coinage, September 14, 1988
 Moral Reconstruction:Christian Lobbyists and the Federal Legislation of Morality, 1865–1920, online Introduction from the book by Gaines M. Foster
 Godless America, 3 June 2005 episode of the radio series This American Life
 ACLU Briefing Paper on Church and State Issues of 25 November 1999

Christian states
Christian fundamentalism
Christianity and politics
Proposed amendments to the United States Constitution